Voŭčyn is a village in Kamenets District, Brest Region, Belarus. It is the birthplace of the last king of Poland, Stanisław August Poniatowski.

History

The village was mentioned in chronicles as early as the 16th century. It was a privately owned village of the Polish–Lithuanian Commonwealth. The village changed owners many times, in the 17th and 18th centuries it belonged to the Gosiewski, Sapieha, Flemming, Czartoryski and Poniatowski families. In 1720 Voŭčyn came into the possession of Stanisław Poniatowski, father of the last King of Poland Stanisław August Poniatowski, born here in 1732.

In the early 18th century, a palace complex was built in Voŭčyn by Prince Fryderyk Michał Czartoryski. The only standing remains is the 1729 Chapel of the Holy Trinity, which in Soviet times was used as a fertilizer warehouse. In 1761, Prince Adam Kazimierz Czartoryski and Izabela Czartoryska got married in Voŭčyn.

In interwar Poland, Voŭčyn was the seat of Gmina Wołczyn, located in the Brześć County, Polesie Voivodeship.

In 1938 the remains of Stanisław August Poniatowski were moved to the Holy Trinity Chapel from St. Catherine's Church in Saint Petersburg. When the town was annexed by the Soviet Union during the invasion of Poland in September 1939, the tomb was despoiled and destroyed. The church was recently renovated.

In 1995 the king's remains were moved to St. John's Cathedral in Warsaw.

Notable people 
Wincenty Korwin Gosiewski (ca.1620–1662), Polish general
Stanisław August Poniatowski (1732–1798), last king of Poland.
Zygmunt Vogel (1764–1826), Polish painter

External links 
 Wołczyn in the Geographical Dictionary of the Kingdom of Poland (1893)
 Andrea Simon "Bashert: A Granddaughter’s Holocaust Quest", University Press of Mississippi, Jackson, 2002

References

Voucyn
Populated places in Brest Region
Kamenets District
Brest Litovsk Voivodeship
Brestsky Uyezd
Polesie Voivodeship